Elvin Dennis Ivory (born July 2, 1948) is a retired professional basketball player who spent one season in the American Basketball Association (ABA) as a member of the Los Angeles Stars during the 1968–69 season. Born in Birmingham, Alabama, he attended University of Louisiana at Lafayette.

External links
 

1948 births
Living people
American men's basketball players
Basketball players from Birmingham, Alabama
Los Angeles Stars players
Louisiana Ragin' Cajuns men's basketball players
Forwards (basketball)